Clarenceville station may refer to:
 Clarenceville station (LIRR)
 Richmond Hill station (LIRR) or Clarenceville station